Adam Craig Parore (born 23 January 1971) is a former wicket-keeper and batsman for the New Zealand cricket team. He played 78 Test cricket matches for New Zealand and 179 One Day International cricket matches. Parore has been the managing director of financial services firm Adam Parore Mortgages. CoinHQ was also founded by him.

International career
He was the first Māori to represent New Zealand in cricket.

He also holds the record for the highest One Day International innings score without a boundary (96 vs India, in Baroda, 1994).

After representing New Zealand for more than a decade, Parore retired from international cricket, his last Test match played against England in Auckland in 2002. He finished with 204 Test dismissals, a New Zealand record.

Personal life
In 2003 he began a relationship with socialite and television presenter Sally Ridge, with whom he had two children, and ran a sports clothing company. Ridge and Parore were involved in a controversial house demolition when they wanted to demolish a 100-year-old house and replace it with a new building.

In 2006, Parore started his own business, Adam Parore Mortgages as a mortgage broker.

In 2009 the couple were embroiled in a $1 million leaky homes lawsuit. They broke up in 2010.

In May 2011 he climbed Mount Everest, the only Test cricketer to do so.

In March 2014 he married 22-year-old Miller Rose MacLeod-McGhie in Hokianga. The couple reportedly separated in 2016.

References

External links

 
 

1971 births
Living people
Auckland cricketers
New Zealand One Day International cricketers
New Zealand Test cricketers
New Zealand cricketers
Northern Districts cricketers
New Zealand cricket commentators
Cricketers at the 1996 Cricket World Cup
Cricketers at the 1998 Commonwealth Games
Cricketers at the 1999 Cricket World Cup
Commonwealth Games bronze medallists for New Zealand
Chennai Superstars cricketers
ICL World XI cricketers
New Zealand Māori cricket team players
New Zealand Māori sportspeople
New Zealand summiters of Mount Everest
People educated at Saint Kentigern College
Commonwealth Games medallists in cricket
North Island cricketers
Wicket-keepers
Medallists at the 1998 Commonwealth Games